() is a political party operating in the Isle of Man. Formed in 1962, it seeks to revoke the status of Man as a British self-governing Crown dependency and establish a completely sovereign state, which would be a republic.

It describes its aims as being:

It is alternatively called or subtitled "The Manx Nationalist Party", but is not to be confused with the Manx National Party, which was a name used by another party.

History

Mec Vannin was formed in 1962 and has held minuted meetings since February 1964.

's growth can be considered to be directly parallel to the Isle of Man's status as a tax haven. In particular, they have campaigned strongly against immigration to the island, particularly from England. This continues to feature strongly in their current platform and policy:

"In a small island nation such as ours, in default of policies to control the growth of the finance sector, policies to control the size of the population are essential for the achievement of economic, ecological and cultural sustainability. The rapid and unnatural population increase, due to an open door policy on immigration, has increased the burden on the island's infrastructure and environment whilst eroding the fabric of community life. As a result, Mec Vannin believes the immediate introduction of immigration controls to be a priority."

In the 1976 election Mec Vannin put up ten candidates. Only one was successful though, Peter Craine. He remains the only person to have been a  Member of the House of Keys (MHK), although several ex-members have gone on to become MHKs, such as Treasury Minister Allan Bell, Phil Gawne and Hazel Hannan.

Peter Craine subsequently left the party, joining the short-lived breakaway Manx National Party which was formed in 1977 and disbanded in 1981.

Additional policy
Mec Vannin's environmentalist policies include opposition to overuse of fossil fuels. They support further decentralisation of power within the island, to local councils.

Other policies include:
 Reforestation - by native deciduous species
 Fishing as "a viable part of the economy", with stronger fisheries protection.
 Farming self-sufficiency for the Isle of Man.
 Revitalisation of Manx tourism
 A Manx university
 A socialised health service
 Separate Manx nationality:
 "Manx nationality must be defined by legislation and a Manx passport introduced, with Manx nationality being first citizenship. Whilst all residents would be eligible for Manx citizenship upon the introduction of legislation, subsequent new residents could only become citizens after due process of naturalisation. Only Manx citizens would be eligible to vote or to stand for representative public office."
 On customs union:
 "The right to determine indirect taxation, including VAT. This necessitates the cessation of the Customs and Excise Agreement."

Mec Vannin is also highly critical of the Manx legal and policing systems, as they currently stand.

Yn Pabyr Seyr
The archive of back-issues available on line is being updated on an ongoing basis. Its name means "The Free Paper" in Manx, but the majority of content is in English.

Office holders
 President: Bernard Moffatt
 Chairman: Mark Kermode
 Secretary: Cristl Jerry
 Treasurer: Paul Kelly
 International Relations Officer: Allen Moore

References

External links
  website
  online
 Options for future relations with European Union

Celtic nationalism
Separatism in the Isle of Man
Secessionist organizations in Europe
Manx nationalist parties
Republican parties
Republicanism in Europe
Pro-independence parties
Republicanism in the Isle of Man
Manx words and phrases
1962 establishments in the Isle of Man
Political parties established in 1962